Jean Mathias Gérard Patry (born 27 December 1996) is a French professional volleyball player. He is a member of the France national team. The 2020 Olympic Champion and the 2022 Nations League winner. At the professional club level, he plays for Allianz Milano.

Honours
 CEV Challenge Cup
  2020/2021 – with Allianz Powervolley Milano

Individual awards
2020: European Olympic Qualification Tournament – Most Valuable Player 
2020: European Olympic Qualification Tournament – Best Opposite Spiker
 2021: CEV Challenge Cup – Most Valuable Player
 2022: FIVB Nations League – Best Opposite Spiker

State awards
 2021:  Knight of the Legion of Honor

References

External links

 
 
 
 Player profile at LegaVolley.it  
 Player profile at Volleybox.net

1996 births
Living people
Sportspeople from Montpellier
French men's volleyball players
Olympic volleyball players of France
Volleyball players at the 2020 Summer Olympics
Medalists at the 2020 Summer Olympics
Olympic medalists in volleyball
Olympic gold medalists for France
French expatriate sportspeople in Italy
Expatriate volleyball players in Italy
Opposite hitters